Bhabatosh Datta (21 February 1911 – 11 January 1997) was a noted Indian economist, academic and writer. He taught at Chittagong College and later became Professor of Economics, Presidency College, Kolkata, where he later Emeritus Professor.

In 1990, he was awarded the Padma Vibhushan, the second highest civilian award, by Government of India.

Early life and background
Datta was born in Patna, Bihar to Hemendra Kishore Datta and Jogmaya Datta. At the time, his father was a professor of Chemistry at Bihar National College, Patna. Thereafter, he did his schooling at various places, including Daulatpur in Khulna district, Mymensingh followed by Dhaka, now in Bangladesh. At his Dhaka school, he edited the school magazine along with fellow student Buddhadeb Bose, who went on to become a noted poet. He completed his schooling from Jagannath College Dhaka, and went on to earn B.A. (Hons.) in Economics and Political Science and M.A. Economics from Presidency College, Kolkata.

Career
He started his career by working briefly at Chittagong College, and Burdwan Raj College, ultimately his received an appointment at Ripon College, Kolkata, later known as Surendranath College. Subsequently, he worked at Islamia College in Kolkata, later renamed Maulana Azad College. In 1948, he went to England on a study leave to submit his doctoral dissertation at London School of Economics after only two years. His dissertation was published in Calcutta as The Economics of Industrialization (1952). After his returned in 1952, he joined the Presidency College, Kolkata, now Presidency University as Professor of Economics. The following year, he joined IMF as chief of South Asia division, however he returned to India in 1956, and rejoined Presidency College, where he continued to work till his retirement in 1962 as Head of the Department. Thereafter, he remained Emeritus Professor at the college, and started working in state education ministry, as he became Director of Public Instruction, Department of General Education and in 1965, Secretary of Education, Government of West Bengal.

He also remained a member of Fourth Finance Commission of India formed in 1964, and also remained a member of the first working committee of Paschimbanga Bangla Akademi, Kolkata.

Personal life
He married Amala Basu in 1939, she died in 1989.

Bibliography

References

External links
 

1911 births
1997 deaths
20th-century Indian economists
Economics educators
Scientists from Kolkata
Writers from Patna
Academic staff of the University of Calcutta
Academic staff of Presidency University, Kolkata
Bengali-language writers
Emeritus Professors in India
Recipients of the Padma Vibhushan in literature & education
20th-century Indian educational theorists